Clive  is a village in central Alberta, Canada. It is located 15 minutes east of Lacombe and 30 minutes from Red Deer.

The village was named in honour of Robert Clive, Commander-in-Chief, India.

Demographics 

In the 2016 Census of Population conducted by Statistics Canada, the Village of Clive recorded a population of 715 living in 286 of its 306 total private dwellings, a  change from its 2011 population of 675.

Services 
The Village of Clive has a grocery store, two bars and numerous other services.

Education 
Clive School is located on the north end of Clive, with about 250-300 students enrolled in kindergarten through grade nine.

Amenities 
Clive has a skate park built beside the school. It includes two eight foot quarter pipes, two six foot quarter pipes, two four foot quarter pipes, and box stairs,

Clive also has an 18-hole disc golf course behind the ball diamond. The course record is 57 shot by little Jimmy McClellan on his 17th birthday.

See also 
List of communities in Alberta
List of villages in Alberta

References

External links 

1912 establishments in Alberta
Villages in Alberta